Otto Wachs (23 July 1909 – 30 December 1998) was a German sailor who competed in the 1936 Summer Olympics. In his later career he was Chairman of HAPAG shipping company at Hamburg and from 1961 to 1966 merchant banker (Berliner Handels-Gesellschaft).

References

1909 births
1998 deaths
German male sailors (sport)
Olympic sailors of Germany
Sailors at the 1936 Summer Olympics – 8 Metre
Olympic bronze medalists for Germany
Olympic medalists in sailing
Medalists at the 1936 Summer Olympics